Love on the Dole is a 1941 British drama film starring Deborah Kerr and Clifford Evans. It was adapted from the novel of the same name by Walter Greenwood. It was the first English-made feature film to show English police wielding batons against a crowd.

Plot 
The film is set in Hanky Park, part of Salford, in 1930 at the height of the Great Depression.

The film centres on the Hardcastle family. Mr Hardcastle is a miner; his son, Harry, is an apprentice at a local engineering firm and Sally, his daughter, works at a cotton mill.

As the depression takes hold, Mr Hardcastle's mine is put on a three-day week and Harry becomes unemployed when his apprenticeship ends.

The family’s plight is made worse by reductions in means tested unemployment benefits (the dole), whilst the unexpected pregnancy of Harry’s girlfriend, Helen, causes further tensions.

Sally is courting factory worker and Labour Party activist Larry Meath, but their marriage plans are put in doubt when Larry loses his job. Larry is fatally injured when he tries to restore calm in a clash with the police during an unemployment march. Sally, reluctantly at first, becomes the mistress of a wealthy local bookmaker to help keep her unemployed family.

Cast

 Deborah Kerr as Sally
 Clifford Evans as Larry
 George Carney as Mr. Hardcastle
 Mary Merrall as Mrs. Hardcastle
 Geoffrey Hibbert as Harry
 Joyce Howard as Helen
 Frank Cellier as Sam Grundy 
 Martin Walker as Ned Narkey 
 Maire O'Neill as Mrs. Dorbell 
 Iris Vandeleur as Mrs. Nattle 
 Marie Ault as Mrs. Jike 
 Marjorie Rhodes as Mrs. Bull
 Ben Williams as Factory Worker (uncredited)
 Kenneth Griffith as Harry's Pal in Billiard Hall (uncredited)
 John Slater as Agitator on Demonstration (uncredited)

Critical reception
Although the book was successful, a proposed film version was rejected by the British Board of Film Censors (BBFC) in 1936 as it was a "very sordid story in very sordid surroundings". However, in 1940 the BBFC approved a similar proposal, with the film finally released in June 1941.

In a contemporary review, The Monthly Film Bulletin wrote, "Here is a film that ranks with the best we have ever produced. The direction is excellent, the photography admirable, and the casting particularly good."

References

External links 
 

1941 films
British black-and-white films
1941 drama films
Films set in Manchester
British drama films
Films scored by Richard Addinsell
Films shot in Greater Manchester
Films shot at British National Studios
1940s English-language films
1940s British films